See entry for Eber, (great-grandson of Noah's son Shem and the father of Peleg and Joktan, sometimes also known as "Heber" in English.)

Heber may be:

Religious traditions
Heber (biblical figure), minor character in the Book of Genesis
Heber the Kenite, mentioned in the Book of Judges 4:17 of the Hebrew Bible as Jael's husband
"Heber" (Hebrew spelling עבר), found once in Luke in the New Testament, referring to Eber of the Old Testament
The Islamic prophet Hud (prophet), also called Heber
According to some British traditions, the name of a people descending from Baath, the first son of Magog, who were supposed to have occupied the Iberian Peninsula and Ireland (Hibernia) prior to arriving at their final destination in the Hebrides, leaving their name in each location

People

Given name
Heber (given name), the origin of the given name and a list of those who bear it
Héber (footballer) (born 1991), Brazilian footballer known mononymously as Héber

Surname
 Alberto Héber Usher, Uruguayan politician
 Luis Alberto Héber, Uruguayan politician
 Mario Héber Usher, Uruguayan politician
 Reginald Heber, Anglican bishop, missionary to India, and author
 Richard Heber, British book-collector
 Rick Heber, American psychologist

Places

Germany
 Heber (hills), a hill chain in Lower Saxony

United States
 Heber-Overgaard, Arizona
 Heber, California
 Heber City, Utah, the largest city with the name
 Heber Springs, Arkansas